Kay Langkawong (born December 21, 1980) is a Thai former professional footballer.

Honours

Queen's Cup Winner

1997 - Thai Farmers Bank

Kor Royal Cup Winner

2000 - Thai Farmers Bank

Thai FA Cup Winner

2009 - Thai Port

References

External links
 https://web.archive.org/web/20100131074925/http://www.thaiportfc.com/first-team/players.html

Kay Langkawong
1979 births
Living people
Kay Langkawong
Kay Langkawong
Kay Langkawong
Kay Langkawong
Association football defenders